El inmigrante ("The Immigrant") is a 2005 documentary directed and written by brothers David and John Eckenrode along with John Sheedy, about immigrant deaths along the U.S.-Mexico border. The film documents the story of the fatal encounter between  Mexican migrant Eusebio de Haro Espinosa and elderly Texan Sam Blackwood, close to Blackwood's property near the international border.

Cast
 The de Haro family
 Brackettville (Texas) community members
 Vigilante border militias in Arizona
 The horseback border patrol in El Paso
 Migrants

Awards
The film won the award of Best Documentary Film at the 2007 Byron Bay International Film Festival.

External links
 

2005 films
2000s Spanish-language films
American documentary films
Mexican documentary films
Mexico–United States border
Documentary films about immigration to the United States
2005 documentary films
2000s English-language films
2000s American films
2000s Mexican films